The appearance of impropriety is a phrase referring to a situation which to a layperson without knowledge of the specific circumstances might seem to raise ethics questions.  For instance, although a person might regularly and reliably collect money for her employer in her personal wallet and later give it to her employer, her putting it in her personal wallet may appear improper and give rise to suspicion, etc.    It is common practice in the business and legal communities to avoid even the appearance of impropriety.

See also
Commingling
Conflict of interest
Scandal
Marit ayin
Caesar's wife must be above suspicion

External links
Appearance of Impropriety  article at the website of the United States Naval Inspector General
Code of Conduct for United States Judges subsection on Appearance of Impropriety

Legal terminology
Political terminology